Grindley may refer to:

People
David Grindley (born 1972), British 400 metres runner
G. C. Grindley (1903–1976), British psychologist
George Grindley (1925–2019), New Zealand geologist
Nigel Grindley (born 1945), British biochemist
Thomas Grindley (born 1864), politician in Alberta, Canada

Other
Grindley Brook, small village in Shropshire, England
Grindley Brook Halt railway station, railway halt in the village of Grindley Brook, Shropshire
Grindley railway station, former railway station to serve the village of Grindley in Staffordshire
Robert M. and Matilda (Kitch) Grindley House, private residence located in Detroit, Michigan
Tushingham cum Grindley, former civil parish in Cheshire, England
W H Grindley, pottery company founded in Stoke-on-Trent in 1880

See also
 Grindlay, a surname